The Smithfield Tithing Office, at 35 W. Center in Smithfield, Utah, is a tithing building which was built sometime around 1910, between 1905 and 1920.  It was listed on the National Register of Historic Places in 1985.

It is a one-story brick bungalow building.

It replaced a previous tithing building which was demolished during 1908–09.

References

Tithing buildings of the Church of Jesus Christ of Latter-day Saints
Bungalow architecture in Utah
National Register of Historic Places in Cache County, Utah
Buildings and structures completed in 1910